Nguyễn Đức Mậu (born 14 January 1948 in Nam Trực District, Nam Định) is a Vietnamese poet. His 'The Old Soldier' is one of many war poems to carry the idea of a nation that has been at war for generations.

References

1948 births
Living people
20th-century Vietnamese poets
Vietnamese male poets
20th-century male writers